Lal Vijay Shahdeo is an Indian writer, director and producer in the Indian film and television industry.

Early life 
He was born in Hesapiri village in Kisko block of Lohardaga. Shahdeo has worked as a theatre director, actor, to his shift to television as casting director, writer, producer and finally a film writer, director and producer.

Career 
Shahdeo has worked with many companies such as UTV, Percept Picture Company, B.R. Films, Creative Eye, Miditech and Big Synergy. Shahdeo had the opportunity to work with television channels in India, including Star Plus, Star One, Sony, Zee TV and Hungama. He has worked as a casting director, senior executive producer, creative director, supervising producer, head of operations, project head, writer and director. 

He has directed short film, The Silent Statue, which was accepted at Cannes Film Festival 2016 in Short Film Corner. Shahdeo directed feature films Lohardaga in Hindi, Nagpuri/Hindi debut Phulmania premiered in the Jharkhand International Film Festival Awards (JIFFA) in 2018 and 2019 respectively. Films  Lohardaga and Phulmania also premiered in the 2019 Cannes Film Festival. In 2022, he wrote and directed Bhojpuri/Hindi flim Nach Baiju Nach which released in 23 September 2022.

Filmography

Film and television

Controversies
In 2019, Shahdeo accused the organiser of second Jharkhand International Film Festival Awards, of mismanagement and bribery.

Awards and honors 
Jharkhand Gaurav Sammaan (2019)
Birsa Munda Jyoti Samman (2021) for best film director.

References

External links 
 Akriti Entertainment Pvt. Ltd., Official website
 

Film directors from Jharkhand
Film producers from Jharkhand
Hindi-language film directors
Living people
People from Lohardaga district
Year of birth missing (living people)
Nagpuria people